The 2019–20 FA Cup qualifying rounds opened the 139th season of competition in England for The Football Association Challenge Cup (FA Cup), the world's oldest association football single knockout competition.

The FA made 736 places available in the FA Cup for the 2019–20 season, the same number as had been accepted the previous year. The 92 teams from the EFL and Premier League received direct entry to the competition proper. The remaining 644 teams, from the National League System (levels 5–10 of the English football league system), entered into the qualifying competition consisting of six rounds of preliminary (2) and qualifying (4) knockout matches. With more eligible entrants than places available, teams from level 10 of the English football league system were accepted up to the point at which the 736 places were full, based on their points per game from the 2018–19 season, with 1.84 points per game being the cut off.

The 32 winning teams from the Fourth qualifying round progressed to the First Round Proper.

Calendar
The calendar for the 2019–20 Emirates FA Cup qualifying rounds, as announced by The Football Association.

Extra preliminary round
Extra preliminary round fixtures were played on 9–13 August 2019. The draw was held on Friday 12 July 2019. A total of 368 teams, from Level 8, Level 9 and Level 10 of English football, entered at this stage of the competition. This round contained 71 teams from Level 10.

Preliminary round
Preliminary round fixtures were played on 23–25 August 2019. The draw was held on Friday 12 July 2019. A total of 136 teams, from Level 7 and Level 8 of English football, entered at this stage of the competition. These teams joined 184 winners from the Extra preliminary round. This round contained 25 teams from Level 10; the lowest-ranked teams in the competition.

First qualifying round
First qualifying round fixtures were played the weekend of 6–8 September 2019. The draw was held on 27 August 2019. A total of 232 teams took part in this stage of the competition, including the 160 winners from the Preliminary round and 72 entering at this stage from the four leagues at Level 7 of English football. The round included seven teams from Level 10, the lowest-ranked teams still in the competition.

Second qualifying round
Second qualifying round ties took place over the weekend of 21–22 September. The draw was held on 9 September 2019. A total of 160 teams took part in this stage of the competition, including the 116 winners from the First qualifying round and 44 entering at this stage from the two leagues at Level 6 of English football. Two teams from Level 10 were included in the draw after earning replays, but both sides lost those replays. This left 14 sides from Level 9 initially as the lowest-ranked teams still in the competition. However, Grays Athletic was removed from the competition on 20 September 2019 for fielding an ineligible player in an earlier round.  Their opponent in the most recent round, March Town from Level 10, advanced instead, making them the lowest ranked team remaining in the competition.

Third qualifying round
Third qualifying round ties took place over the weekend of 5–6 October. The draw was held on 23 September 2019. A total of 80 teams took part in this stage of the competition - the winners from the previous round only with no new teams added to the competition this round. Three teams from Level 9 - Abbey Rangers, Hadley, and Tavistock - advanced to the Third qualifying round and were the lowest-ranked teams remaining in the competition.

Fourth qualifying round
The 40 winners from the Third qualifying round were joined by the 24 clubs at level 5 for 32 ties. The draw was made on 7 October 2019. The round contained five teams from Level 8 - Colne, Belper Town, Whyteleafe, Chichester City and Maldon & Tiptree, the lowest-ranked teams remaining in the competition.

Competition proper

32 winners from the Fourth qualifying round advance to the First Round Proper, where 47 teams from League One (Level 3) and League Two (Level 4) of English football, operating in the English Football League, enter the competition. The first round will include Maldon & Tiptree F.C. from level 8, while Chichester City F.C., also from level 8, received the first round bye due to the expulsion of Bury F.C. from the FA Cup, and will progress directly to the Second round.

Broadcasting rights
The qualifying rounds are not covered by the FA Cup's broadcasting contracts held by BBC Sport and BT Sport, although one game per round will be broadcast by the BBC on its media platforms.

References

External links
 The FA Cup

qualifying rounds
FA Cup qualifying rounds